Balomar is an undescribed, dead language, formerly spoken in the Province of Entre Ríos, Argentina.

References

Charruan languages
Languages of Argentina
Extinct languages of South America